Amanita rhacopus is a species of Amanita found in east coast of the United States

References

External links

rhacopus
Fungi of North America
Fungi described in 2018